United Arab Emirates participated at the 2018 Asian Para Games which was held in Jakarta, Indonesia from 6 to 13 October 2018. The Emirati delegation was composed of 42 athletes who competed in eight sports, namely: athletics, powerlifting, shooting, boccia, cycling, table tennis, archery and judo.

Medalists

Medals by sport

Medals by day

See also
 United Arab Emirates at the 2018 Asian Games

References

Nations at the 2018 Asian Para Games
2018 in Emirati sport